Dancer with Bruised Knees is the second album by Kate & Anna McGarrigle, released in 1977. It employed several notable folk musicians to contribute a bluegrass feel to many of the tracks. The album also includes three French songs, one by the McGarrigles with Philippe Tatartcheff, and two traditional numbers.

Guest musicians included John Cale, Dane Lanken, Bill Monroe, Dave Mattacks and Pat Donaldson.

Reception

Robert Christgau said the album is "Not as tuneful as some might wish" but is nonetheless "Even better than the debut". He particularly complimented the studio techniques.

Track listing
"Dancer with Bruised Knees" (Anna McGarrigle) – 3:46
"Southern Boys" (Kate McGarrigle) – 3:20
"No Biscuit Blues" (William Dumaresq, Galt MacDermot) – 1:43
"First Born" (Kate McGarrigle) – 3:55
"Blanche comme la neige" (Traditional; arranged by Kate & Anna McGarrigle) – 3:44
"Perrine était servante" (Traditional; arranged by Kate & Anna McGarrigle) – 3:14
"Be My Baby" (Anna McGarrigle) – 3:11
"Walking Song" (Kate McGarrigle) – 3:33
"Naufragée du tendre (Shipwrecked)" (Anna McGarrigle, Philippe Tatartcheff) – 3:46
"Hommage à Grungie" (Kate McGarrigle) – 3:54
"Kitty Come Home" (Anna McGarrigle) – 4:36
"Come a Long Way" (Kate McGarrigle) – 2:17

Personnel
Anna McGarrigle - banjo, button accordion on "First Born" and "Come a Long Way", keyboards, vocals (tracks A1, A5-B1, B3, B5, B6)
Kate McGarrigle - guitar, piano, button accordion on "Blanche Comme la Neige" and "Perrine Etait Servante", organ on "Kitty Come Home", banjo on "Come a Long way", vocals (tracks A2-A6, B2-B4, B6)
John Cale - organ on "Dancer with Bruised Knees"; marimba on "Be My Baby"
Richard Davis - bass on "Southern Boys"
Grady Tate - drums on "Dancer with Bruised Knees"
Sue Evans - percussion on "Be My Baby"
George Bohanon - horns on "Naufragee du Tendre (Shipwrecked)"
Jane McGarrigle - organ on "Blanche Comme la Neige" and "Perrine Etait Servante"
Andrew Cowan - guitar
Ron Doleman - violin on "Blanche Comme la Neige" and "Perrine Etait Servante"
Pat Donaldson - bass
Gordie Fleming - accordion on "Walking Song"
Steve Gadd - drums
Scot Lang - guitar
Dane Lanken - trumpet on "Perrine Etait Servante"
Gilles Losier - bass on "Walking Song", violin
Dave Mattacks - drums
Tommy Morgan - harmonica on "Southern Boys"
Ken Pearson - organ on "First Born" and "Be My Baby", electric piano on "Naufragee du Tendre (Shipwrecked)"
Warren Smith - congas on "First Born"
Chaim Tannenbaum - guitar, harmonica on "The Biscuit Song" and "Hommage a Grungie", mandolin and recorder on "Blanche Comme la Neige", recorder on "Perrine Etait Servante", backing vocals
Jay Ungar - violin on "Come a Long Way"
Michael Visceglia - bass
Peter Weldon - banjo, harmonica on "Blanche Comme la Neige" and "Perrine Etait Servante", vocals

References

External links
 

1977 albums
Kate & Anna McGarrigle albums
Albums produced by Joe Boyd
Warner Music Group albums